The Recife Brazil Temple is the 101st operating temple of the Church of Jesus Christ of Latter-day Saints (LDS Church).

The temple exterior is finished with Asa branca granite from Brazil and features a single spire topped with a gold statue of the angel Moroni. This temple is larger than many LDS temples built during the same time in order to accommodate the 137,500 members of the church in northern Brazil. Previously, the closest temple was in São Paulo.

History
LDS Church president Gordon B. Hinckley, during a visit to members and missionaries in Brazil, presided over the groundbreaking ceremony on 11 November 1996. During the open house held prior to the dedication, 78,386 visitors toured the temple. Hinckley and James E. Faust each conducted two dedicatory sessions for the Recife Brazil Temple on 15 December 2000.  More than 7,000 people attended.

In 2020, the Recife Brazil Temple was closed temporarily during the year in response to the coronavirus pandemic.

See also

 Comparison of temples of The Church of Jesus Christ of Latter-day Saints
 List of temples of The Church of Jesus Christ of Latter-day Saints
 List of temples of The Church of Jesus Christ of Latter-day Saints by geographic region
 Temple architecture (Latter-day Saints)
 The Church of Jesus Christ of Latter-day Saints in Brazil

References

External links
 Official Recife Brazil Temple page
 Recife Brazil Temple at ChurchofJesusChristTemples.org

20th-century Latter Day Saint temples
Buildings and structures in Pernambuco
Temples (LDS Church) completed in 2000
Temples (LDS Church) in Brazil
2000 establishments in Brazil